Wabasca is the name (coming from Cree wapuskau, "white rapid") for different places in northern Alberta:

Wabasca, Alberta - a hamlet in Municipal District of Opportunity No. 17, Alberta
Wabasca Airport - an airport serving the hamlet
Wabasca Lakes - South and North Wabasca Lake
Wabasca River - a tributary of the Peace River
Wabasca 166 - a series of Indian reserves of the Bigstone Cree Nation
Wabasca oil field - a large oil field in remote northern Alberta